The spider species Herpyllus ecclesiasticus is commonly called the eastern parson spider, after the abdominal markings resembling an old-style cravat worn by clergy in the 18th century. It is mainly found in North America east of the Rocky Mountains, i.e., Alberta, Canada east to Nova Scotia, Canada and south to Tamaulipas, Mexico and Florida, USA. Individuals can be found throughout the year. They can be found in homes and under rocks or logs in deciduous forests.

Description
Individuals are covered with black hairs on the cephalothorax and gray hairs on the abdomen. On the back is the distinctive white mark that gives the species its common name; there is a small white spot above the spinnerets.

Behavior
During the day, individuals reside in silken retreats. They emerge to hunt at night.

Bite
Bites are painful, and some individuals may experience an allergic reaction.

References

Gnaphosidae
Spiders of North America
Spiders described in 1832